Foulamory  is a town and sub-prefecture in Gaoual Prefecture, in the Boké Region of northwestern Guinea. As of 2014 it had a population of 10,207 people.

References

Sub-prefectures of the Boké Region